Sowbelly Canyon is located in the northwestern corner of Nebraska.

Sowbelly Canyon is a little-known portion of the Pine Ridge. A bed and breakfast in the lower bluffs and pines of the canyon was destroyed by a wildfire in July 2006.

Sowbelly Canyon was named when hungry soldiers who had been fleeing Indians were offered sowbelly (bacon) by the rescue party. Sowbelly Creek was named from the same incident.

References

External links
Sowbelly Canyon information

Landforms of Nebraska
Landforms of Sioux County, Nebraska
Canyons and gorges of the United States